Jean Roudaut (1 June 1929, Morlaix) was a French writer and professor of French literature who taught in the universities of Thessaloniki, Pisa, and Fribourg.

Bibliography   
1964: Michel Butor ou le livre futur, proposition, Éditions Gallimard
1967: Trois villes orientées, passage, Gallimard
1968: La Chambre, parenthèse, Gallimard
1971: Poètes et grammairiens au XVIIIe, anthologie, Gallimard
1974: Les Prisons, novel, Gallimard
1978: Autre part, paysages d’accompagnement, Gallimard
1978: Aître, Orange Exp.
1980: Ce qui nous revient, relais critique, Gallimard, Prix Broquette-Gonin of the Académie française
1988: Une ombre au tableau, littérature et peinture, Ubacs
1989: Lieu de composition, tournant, Gallimard
1990: Les Villes imaginaires dans la littérature française. Les douze portes, Hatier
1991: Georges Perros, Éditions Seghers, series "Poètes d’aujourd’hui"
1994: Spires, éditions P.A.P.
1995: Louis-René des Forêts, Les Contemporains, Éditions du Seuil
1996:Les dents de Bérénice, Essai sur la représentation et l'évocation des bibliothèques, Deyrolle, Prix Émile Faguet of the Académie française
1996: Encore un peu de neige, essay on La Chambre des enfants by Louis-René des Forêts, prélude, Mercure de France
1998: Sans lieu d’être, travelog, Le Feu de nuict
1999: La Nuit des jours, pêle-mêle assemblé, Lézardes, Revue de Belles Lettres
1999: Dans le temps, Théodore Balmoral, 1999, puis éditions Fario, collection Théodore Balmoral, 2016.
2001: Robert Pinget, Le vieil homme et l’enfant, Éditions Zoé
2008: Les Trois Anges, essai sur quelques citations de À la recherche du temps perdu, Honoré Champion
2009: L'Art de la conversation, Empreintes
2012: Un mardi rue de Rome, Notes sur un livre en paroles, William Blake an Co édit
2012: En quête d’un nom, Écho à quelques citations de À la Recherche du temps perdu par Marcel Proust, La Dogana
2014: Vu d'ici, apologue, Coll. 80 mondes

External links 
 Jean Roudaut on Babelio
 Jean Roudaut publications on CAIRN
 Jean Roudaut on France Culture
 Jean Roudaut on the site of the Académie française
 Jean Roudaut on La République des Lettres

Winners of the Prix Broquette-Gonin (literature)
20th-century French non-fiction writers
Academic staff of the University of Fribourg
1929 births
People from Morlaix
Living people